The 1991 Philippine Basketball Association (PBA) Third Conference was the last conference of the 1991 PBA season. It started on September 15 and ended on December 15, 1991. The tournament allows one-import with the height limit of 6'1" each per team.

Format
The following format will be observed for the duration of the conference:
The teams were divided into 2 groups.

Group A:
Ginebra San Miguel
Pepsi Hotshots
Tivoli Milkmasters
San Miguel Beermen

Group B:
Alaska Milkmen
Shell Rimula X
Purefoods TJ Hotdogs
Swift Mighty Meaty Hotdogs

Teams in a group will play against each other once and against teams in the other group twice; 11 games per team; Teams are then seeded by basis on win–loss records. Ties are broken among point differentials of the tied teams. Standings will be determined in one league table; teams do not qualify by basis of groupings.
The top five teams after the eliminations will advance to the semifinals.
Semifinals will be two round robin affairs with the remaining five teams. Results from the eliminations will be carried over. A playoff incentive for a finals berth will be given to the team that will win at least five of their eight semifinal games.
The top two teams in the semifinals advance to the best of five finals. The next two teams dispute the third-place trophy in a best of three playoff.

Elimination round

Team standings

Semifinals

Team standings

Cumulative standings

Semifinal round standings:

Third place playoffs

Finals

References

External links
 PBA.ph

1991
Third Conference